Nibbio may refer to:

 Aviamilano Nibbio, Italian monoplane
 599 GTZ Nibbio Zagato, Ferrari grand tourer
 Teichfuss Nibbio, Italian single seat glider
 Italian ship Nibbio